"Mourir demain" is a 2003 song recorded by the Canadian artist Natasha St-Pier. She performed the song as a duet with the French singer Pascal Obispo. It was released on 18 June 2004, as the second single from St-Pier's fourth studio album, L'Instant d'après, on which it features as third track. This song, which has rock sonorities, achieved a great success in France and Belgium (Wallonia), reaching the top ten.

Song information
The text was written by Lionel Florence. The music has been composed by ASDORVE. It was available on Obispo's 2004 albums Fan and Studio fan in a longer version. It was also included on many French compilations such as NRJ Music Awards 2005.

The song was covered in 2007 by Yannick Noah, Patricia Kaas, Jenifer Bartoli and Jean-Baptiste Maunier. This version is available on Les Enfoirés' album La Caravane des Enfoirés, as third track.

Chart performances
In France, the single charted for 20 on the singles chart, from 20 June to 31 October 2004. It peaked at number seven in the first and the third weeks and stayed in the top ten for nine weeks. It was certified Gold and was the 31st best-selling single of the year.

Charted for 19 weeks on the Ultratop 40 (the Belgian chart), the song went to number 30 on 26 June, then jumped to number nine and reached number four in the seventh and eighth weeks. It stayed for nine weeks in the top ten and dropped slowly. It was 20th on the Annual Chart.

"Mourir demain" was St-Pier's most successful single in Switzerland in terms of peak position and chart trajectory. The single started at a peak of number 18 on 4 July, then dropped rather slowly on the chart, and totaled 13 weeks in the top 13, 17 weeks in the top 50 and 25 weeks on the chart.

Track listings
 CD single
 "Mourir demain" (album version) — 3:37
 "Mourir demain" (fan version) — 4:08

 Digital download
 "Mourir demain" (album version) — 3:37
 "Mourir demain" (fan version) — 4:08

Charts and sales

Peak positions

Year-end charts

Certifications

References

2003 songs
2004 singles
Natasha St-Pier songs
Pascal Obispo songs
Male–female vocal duets
Songs written by Lionel Florence